Nagino Maruyama (born September 26, 1999) is a Japanese classical pianist from Aichi Prefecture, Japan. She rose to international fame by becoming the youngest contestant ever when she participated in XVII International Chopin Piano Competition in 2015.

Career 

Maruyama's first major competition was at Osaka International Music Competition (:ja:大阪国際音楽コンクール) in 2009 where she finished 1st place in the concerto section. She entered CRR de Paris (:fr:Conservatoire à rayonnement régional de Paris) at the age of 12, and studied under the supervision of Olivier Gardon and Jean-Marc Luisada. After this turning point, she competed and won several famous competitions, such as the "Concours International de Piano" created by Claude Kahn for classical pianists in 2013, Piano Talents Concorso Milan 2014 and Flame Competition 2014. As one of the youngest pianist from Japan to receive recognition in international competitions, Maruyama has been 
invited to perform at several music festivals in Europe, such as in 2015 at Brussels, Belgium and music festival of Olivier Messiaen's piano works at Banyuls, France in 2017. Due to her rising fame, Osaka International Music Competition has invited her back to perform at a Gala concert in Carnegie Hall in the same year. In parallel with her activities as a pianist, Maruyama entered Conservatoire de Paris known as Conservatoire national supérieur de musique et de danse de Paris in 2016, admitted unanimously as she finished first in her class, with support of a special scholarship sponsored by Affiliated High School of Tokyo College of Music and Rohm Music Foundation. She entered École Normale de Musique de Paris to widen the range of her music in 2018 and graduated in 2019 in just one year. At the same time, she graduated from bachelor course of Conservatoire national supérieur de musique et de danse de Paris and entered the master course in 2019.

References

External links 
 Nagino Maruyama Facebook Official fan page
 Nagino Maruyama Facebook
 Nagino Maruyama YouTube official channel

1999 births
Japanese classical pianists
Japanese women pianists
Women classical pianists
Living people
People from Toyoake, Aichi
Musicians from Aichi Prefecture
21st-century Japanese women musicians
21st-century classical pianists
21st-century women pianists